Enterprise is an unincorporated community in Shelby County, in the U.S. state of Missouri.

History
Enterprise sprang up in the early 1880s around a general store.  A post office called Enterprise was established in 1885, and remained in operation until 1907.

References

Unincorporated communities in Shelby County, Missouri
Unincorporated communities in Missouri